Métal Hurlant Chronicles is an English-language Franco-Belgian television science fiction anthology series based on the popular comics anthology magazine , known in the United States as Heavy Metal. Each episode is a self-contained story taking place on a different planet with a different cast, and the episodes are linked together only by the idea that an asteroid, the "", passes the planet in question during the events of the story. The show's premise originated with Guillaume Lubrano, who put together a self-financed pilot to pitch the show, which was broadcast as the series' third episode. Lubrano and Justine Veillot produce the show through their company WE Productions. It was largely filmed in Bucharest, Romania.

The series was premiered on French television on 27 October 2012 on France 4. Broadcast rights for various European countries such as Germany, Austria and Luxembourg, were bought by Sony Pictures Television.

Plot 
As an anthology series, each episode is a self-contained science-fiction story taking place in a different world, with different characters played by a different cast and adapted from a story previously published in the  magazine. However, the show also proposes that all the stories are linked together by an asteroid, called the "", which is passing close to the planet where the episode's story is taking place.

The opening credits, narrated in French by voice actor Benoît Allemane, inform that the "" (Screaming Metal) is the last fragment of what was once a living planet, led to destruction by the madness of its inhabitants and condemned to travel ceaselessly through space and time, screaming its sadness and despair.

Cast 
A number of notable British, French, American and Dutch actors have performed in various episodes of the show, including Scott Adkins, Karl E. Landler, Michael Jai White, James Marsters, Michelle Ryan, David Belle, Dominique Pinon, Kelly Brook, Joe Flanigan, Frédérique Bel and Rutger Hauer among others.

Broadcast 

After being initially expected for early 2012, all six episodes of season one were broadcast on France 4 in a late night time slot over the course of two nights in either default dubbed French or optional subtitled original English audio tracks, between 27 October and 3 November of the same year.  was expected to rebroadcast season one in France sometime in 2013.

Sony Pictures Television has bought the broadcast rights for several European countries, where it was at least aired on Animax in Germany, Austria and Switzerland.

Syfy Channel began airing the first season of the series in the U.S. on 14 April 2014 on Mondays at 8:00 and 8:30 p.m with various repeats during the week following.

Reception 
Broadcast on 27 October 2012 after 3 episodes of Doctor Who that gathered a 1.4% share on the night,  succeeded in raising the global share for channel France 4, bringing it to a tie with W9 and beating out Gulli, NT1 & D8.

The premiere episode attracted 347,000 viewers, garnering a 2.2% share at 11 p.m, but lost about 100,000 viewers for the next two episodes broadcast on the same night. Overall the night held 2.4% of 15- to 34-year-olds and 3.5% of men aged 15 to 49.

When it debuted on SyFy in 2014, its viewership was slightly below normal for a pilot in its time slot, and then steadily declined. Its critical reception has been tepid, from the start. Generally, the series is described as having decent visual effects, but being poorly written and produced, with inconsistent acting.

Series overview

Episodes 
All 12 episodes were directed by Guillaume Lubrano.

Season 1

Season 2

Home media
Shout Factory released both seasons on 14 April 2015 on Blu-ray and DVD.

References

External links 
  at France4.fr
 

2010s French television series
French science fiction television series
Heavy Metal (magazine)
2012 French television series debuts
French anthology television series
English-language television shows
Works by Geoff Johns
Television series based on French comics
Science fiction anthology television series
2014 French television series endings